Jonas Buud born 28 March 1974, is a Swedish ultra-distance runner who lives in Mora, central Sweden.

Buud is a former orienteer who changed to long-distance running and has achieved international success. He became European Champion over 100 kilometres in 2009 and 2010, and was runner-up at the World Championships in 2009, 2010, 2012, and 2014. In the combined European/World championship over 100 km on April 22, 2012, he finished second in both races with a time of 6:28:59, a new Swedish record.

In 2014 Buud for the eighth consecutive year won the Swiss Alpine Marathon, one of Europe's largest ultra marathon races, over a 78 km distance in the Alps. In 2013 he also finished second in the world's oldest and largest ultra-distance race, the Comrades Marathon in South Africa, to achieve the best Swedish placement in the Comrades' 88-year history.

In 2015 he won the World championship over 100 km with the time 6:22:48, a new Swedish record.

Wins
 2007
Swiss Alpine Marathon 2008
Swiss Alpine Marathon 2009
Karlstad 6H 2010
Täby Extreme Challenge 2010, new Swedish record over 100 miles at 12:32:03
Swiss Alpine Marathon 2010
Swiss Alpine Marathon 2011
Swiss Alpine Marathon 2012
Swiss Alpine Marathon 2013
Swiss Alpine Marathon 2014
Ultravasan 2014
Ultravasan 2015
World Championship over 100 km 2015
Tarawera Ultramarathon 2016

References

External links

Swedish Ultracommittee web page
Jonas Buud's blog

1974 births
Living people
Swedish male long-distance runners
Swedish male marathon runners
Swedish ultramarathon runners
Male ultramarathon runners
People from Mora Municipality
Sportspeople from Dalarna County